The Nemzeti Bajnokság I (commonly abbreviated NB I) is the premier men's professional handball league in Hungary, administered by the Hungarian Handball Federation. Since 2016 the official name of the championship is K&H Férfi Kézilabda Liga due to sponsorship reasons.

Overview
Running since 1951, the Hungarian championship is among the strongests in Europe. MKB Veszprém KC have won the EHF Cup Winners' Cup in 2008 and have reached the semi-final of the EHF Champions League three times in the last nine seasons, capturing a silver medal in 2002. Main domestic rivals Pick Szeged are also regular members of the Champions League.

Famous handball players who have played in the league include Carlos Perez, Zlatko Saračević, Mirza Džomba, Árpád Sterbik, Kiril Lazarov, László Nagy, Dániel Buday, Balázs Laluska, József Éles, Julio Fis, Rolando Uríos, Nenad Peruničić, Vlado Šola, Dejan Perić, Vladimir Hernandez, Gergő Iváncsik and many others.

Currently, it consists of 14 teams. The top four teams after the regular season qualify for the playoffs, where a best-of-three system is used. Teams ranked fifth to ninth and tenth to twelfth decide their final places in a classification round, using a double round robin system, playing six additional rounds. Depending on their final position in the regular season, they are awarded bonus points which are added to the points they earn in the postseason.

According to the EHF league ranking, NB I champions and runners-up receive an automatic spot in the Group phase of the forthcoming Champions League season, while following two clubs enter the EHF Cup. Teams ranked thirteenth and fourteenth get relegated and will be replaced by the winners of the Eastern and Western group of the second division.

Current season

Teams for season 2022–23

Sponsorship 
The league went through various name changes depending on the sponsor for the given season(s): 

 –2002: No sponsor
 2002–2012: Budapest Bank (Budapest Bank Kézilabda Liga)
 2012–2016: No sponsor (Nemzeti Bajnokság I - NB I)
 2016– : K&H Bank (K&H liga)

Format 
As we can see from the chart the number of teams in the Hungarian First Division changed a lot and continuously. The league started in 1951 with four teams and with the formation of teams the league expanded continuously. Currently, there are 14 teams in the first division.

Title holders

 1951 : Vörös Meteor
 1952 : Honvéd
 1953 : Újpest
 1954 : Vörös Meteor
 1955 : Vörös Meteor
 1956 : Suspended 
 1957 : Vörös Meteor
 1958 : Újpest
 1959 : Bp. Spartacus 
 1960 : Bp. Spartacus
 1961 : Bp. Spartacus
 1962 : Bp. Spartacus
 1963 : Bp. Honvéd
 1964 : Bp. Honvéd
 1965 : Bp. Honvéd
 1966 : Bp. Honvéd
 1967 : Bp. Honvéd
 1968 : Bp. Honvéd
 1969 : Elektromos SE
 1970 : Elektromos SE
 1971 : Elektromos SE
 1972 : Bp. Honvéd
 1973 : Bp. Spartacus
 1974 : Tatabánya
 1975 : Debreceni Dózsa
 1976 : Bp. Honvéd
 1977 : Bp. Honvéd
 1978 : Tatabányai Bányász
 1979 : Tatabányai Bányász
 1980 : Bp. Honvéd
 1981 : Bp. Honvéd
 1982 : Bp. Honvéd
 1983 : Bp. Honvéd
 1984 : Tatabányai Bányász
 1985 : Veszprém
 1986 : Veszprém
 1987 : Győri ETO
 1988/89 : Győri ETO
 1989/90 : Győri ETO
 1990/91 : Elektromos SE
 1991/92 : Veszprém
 1992/93 : Veszprém
 1993/94 : Veszprém
 1994/95 : Veszprém
 1995/96 : Szeged
 1996/97 : Veszprém
 1997/98 : Veszprém
 1998/99 : Veszprém
 1999/00 : Dunaferr
 2000/01 : Veszprém
 2001/02 : Veszprém
 2002/03 : Veszprém
 2003/04 : Veszprém
 2004/05 : Veszprém
 2005/06 : Veszprém
 2006/07 : Szeged
 2007/08 : Veszprém
 2008/09 : Veszprém
 2009/10 : Veszprém
 2010/11 : Veszprém
 2011/12 : Veszprém
 2012/13 : Veszprém
 2013/14 : Veszprém
 2014/15 : Veszprém
 2015/16 : Veszprém
 2016/17 : Veszprém
 2017/18 : Szeged
 2018/19 : Veszprém
 2019/20 : Not awarded
 2020/21 : Szeged
 2021/22 : Szeged

Performances

By club

By counties
The following table lists the Hungarian handball champions by counties of Hungary.

 The bolded teams are currently playing in the 2019-20 season of the Hungarian League.

Clubs 

Since 1951,  clubs have participated in the Hungarian League. Below the list of Hungarian League clubs who have participated in the first division. The club with the most appearances are the 28-time champions Ferencváros, however the club spent three years in the Nemzeti Bajnokság II (Hungarian Second Division) between 2006 and 2009. The only clubs who have never been relegated are Újpest.

Notes
 The teams in bold are competing in the 2015–16 season of the Hungarian League.

Statistics

EHF coefficients

The following data indicates Hungarian coefficient rankings between European handball leagues.

Country ranking
EHF League Ranking for 2018/19 season:

1.  (1)  Handball-Bundesliga (128.50)
2.  (2)  Liga ASOBAL (115)
3.  (3)  Nemzeti Bajnokság I (106.83)
4.  (4)  LNH Division 1 (105.83)
5.  (5)  Polish Superliga (75.71)

Club ranking
EHF Club Ranking as of 3 March 2019:

 2.  Veszprém (912)
 9.  Szeged (685)
 40.  Tatabánya (241)
 54.  Balatonfüred (156)
 61.  Csurgó (135)

In European competitions

See also

 Nemzeti Bajnokság I Top Scorers
 Magyar Kupa (National Cup of Hungary)
 Hungarian handball clubs in European competitions
 Hungarian Handballer of the Year

References

External links 
 Hungarian Habdall Federation 
 Hungary at EHF
 NB I current season results and table at Soccerway
 Hétméteres - men's handball website

 
1951 establishments in Hungary
 
Professional sports leagues in Hungary